The Sanremo Music Festival 2002 was the 52nd annual Sanremo Music Festival, held at the Teatro Ariston in Sanremo, province of Imperia, between 5 and 9 March 2002 and broadcast by Rai 1.

The show was presented by Pippo Baudo, assisted by Manuela Arcuri and Vittoria Belvedere. Baudo also served as the artistic director of the Festival.

The winner of the Big Artists section was the band Matia Bazar with the song "Messaggio d'amore". Daniele Silvestri won the Mia Martini Critics Award with the song "Salirò".

Anna Tatangelo won the "Newcomers" section with the song "Doppiamente fragili".
 
After every night,   Simona Ventura and Francesco Giorgino hosted Dopofestival, a talk show about the Festival with the participation of singers and journalists.

Participants and results

Big Artists

Newcomers

Guests

References 

Sanremo Music Festival by year
2002 in Italian music
2002 music festivals
2002 in Italian television